Shekhanya is a community settlement in northern Israel. It is named after a priest family from the Bible (2 Chronicles 24:11). Located in the Galilee between Karmiel and Shefar'am, it falls under the jurisdiction of Misgav Regional Council.

History
The village was established in 1980 as part of the Lookouts in the Galilee plan to increase Jewish settlement in the area. The community had been formed in 1978.

References

Community settlements
Agricultural Union
Populated places established in 1980
Populated places in Northern District (Israel)
1980 establishments in Israel